The McAlester News-Capital (formerly the News-Capital & Democrat) is a daily newspaper published in McAlester, Oklahoma, United States, covering Southeastern Oklahoma. It is owned by CNHI.

Journalists James Beaty, Kevin Harvison, MJ Brickey and Matt Goisman anchor the editorial staff. Its editor, Glenn Puit, has written five true crime novels. The paper is published Tuesday through Friday and on Sunday.  It was founded by Lowell and Lucille Turner, who published and edited it for many years. Their son, Fred Turner then published and edited.

References

Newspapers published in Oklahoma
Pittsburg County, Oklahoma